Cyperus limosus is a species of sedge that is native to eastern parts of Asia.

See also 
 List of Cyperus species

References 

limosus
Plants described in 1859
Flora of Vietnam
Flora of Manchuria
Flora of Russia
Taxa named by Karl Maximovich